General elections were held in the Gambia on 4 and 5 May 1982. Following a constitutional amendment in March 1982, for the first time the president was elected by a popular vote alongside the National Assembly. Both elections were won by the People's Progressive Party, whose leader Dawda Jawara remained president.

Results

President

National Assembly

References

Gambia
Parliamentary elections in the Gambia
Election
Presidential elections in the Gambia
Election and referendum articles with incomplete results
May 1982 events in Africa